Dickson Fjord is a fjord in King Christian X Land, eastern Greenland.

Administratively it lies in the Northeast Greenland National Park area. This fjord is part of the King Oscar Fjord system.

History 
This fjord was first surveyed in 1899 by Swedish Arctic explorer Alfred Gabriel Nathorst during the Swedish Greenland Expedition in search of survivors of S. A. Andrée's Arctic balloon expedition of 1897. Nathorst named it after Swedish politician Robert Dickson (1843–1924), one of the financial backers of the venture.

Geography
Dickson Fjord is in the northernmost area of the King Oscar Fjord system. It is the biggest branch of Kempe Fjord. Its mouth opens on the northern side at the western end of the fjord, where there is a junction of three branches, the other two being Röhss Fjord and Rhedin Fjord. The Hisinger Glacier  has its terminus at the fjord's head and the Fulach Glacier in the northern shore.

Dickson Fjord is surrounded by high mountains and its shores are very steep.

See also
List of fjords of Greenland

References

External links
Simplified geologic map of Central Fjord region of East Greenland

Fjords of Greenland